Laura Wade is an English playwright.

Early life
Wade was born in Bedford, Bedfordshire. She grew up in Sheffield, South Yorkshire, where her father worked for a computer company. After completing her secondary education at Lady Manners School in Bakewell, Derbyshire, she studied drama at Bristol University and was later a member of the Royal Court Theatre Young Writers' Programme.

Career
Laura Wade's first play, Limbo, was produced at the Sheffield Crucible Studio Theatre in 1996. 16 Winters was produced at the Bristol Old Vic Basement Theatre in 2000. After university she worked for the children's theatre company Playbox Theatre in Warwick. Wade's adaptation of W. H. Davies' Young Emma opened at the Finborough Theatre, London (where she was later Writer-in-Residence) in December 2003. Both Young Emma and  16 Winters were directed by Tamara Harvey, a contemporary from Bristol. In 2004, Wade was a writer on attachment at Soho Theatre and her play Colder Than Here was produced there in February 2005. Her next play Breathing Corpses played at the Royal Court Theatre Upstairs in March 2005. In March 2006, she returned to the Soho Theatre with Other Hands. 2010 marked her reappearance at the Sheffield Crucible with her reworking of Alice in Wonderland, entitled Alice.

Wade's first radio play, Otherkin, was broadcast on BBC Radio 4 on 30 August 2007, a 45-minute play billed as episode 2 of the Looking for Angels series. Her second, Hum, about the Bristol Hum, was broadcast on BBC Radio 3 on 20 May 2009. Between these two she also wrote Coughs and Sneezes for the Radio 4 series Fact to Fiction. In April 2010, her play Posh began a sell-out run at the Jerwood Theatre Downstairs at the Royal Court Theatre, London. An article about Wade in the London Evening Standard at the time drew parallels between the Riot Club, the subject of Posh, and the Bullingdon Club, an exclusive Oxford University dining society. On 11 May 2012, an updated version of Posh opened at the Duke of York's Theatre in London, Wade's first play to appear in the West End. A film adaptation of the play, The Riot Club, directed by Lone Scherfig, was released in 2014. In February 2015, the regional premiere of Posh was co-produced by Nottingham Playhouse and Salisbury Playhouse.

In 2015, Wade adapted Sarah Waters novel Tipping the Velvet into a stage play of the same name. The play premiered at Lyric Hammersmith in September 2015, before transferring to the Royal Lyceum Theatre, Edinburgh.

On 4 July 2018, Wade's play Home, I'm Darling premiered at Theatr Clwyd. It was directed by Tamara Harvey, and starred Katherine Parkinson. The play transferred to the National Theatre for a summer 2018 run, to the Duke of York's Theatre in January 2019, and later won Best Comedy at the 2019 Laurence Olivier Awards.

Wade adapted the unfinished Jane Austen novel The Watsons into a play, which premiered at Chichester Festival Theatre on 3 November 2018, directed by Samuel West. It had a further run at the Menier Chocolate Factory from 20 September 2019. The West End transfer of The Watsons was delayed by the COVID-19 pandemic.

Wade's plays are published by Oberon Books in the UK and by Dramatists Play Service in the US. 

On 25 August 2022 it was announced that Laura Wade would be one of the writers and executive producers of the new Disney+ series Rivals, based on the novel by Jilly Cooper.

Personal life
From 2007 to 2011, Wade lived with actor Samuel West, son of actors Timothy West and Prunella Scales. After a two-year split, Wade and West reunited, and now have two daughters, born in 2014 and 2017.

Plays

Published
Colder Than Here, 2005, premiered at the Soho Theatre
American premiere, produced by MCC Theater, New York, September 2005
Breathing Corpses, 2005, premiered at the Royal Court Theatre
American premiere, produced by Luna Theater Company  at Walnut Street Theatre, Philadelphia, October 2007
Other Hands, 2006, premiered at the Soho Theatre
American premiere, produced by Luna Theater Company  at Walnut Street Theatre, Philadelphia, January 2010
Catch, 2006, premiered at the Royal Court Theatre
Alice, 2010, premiered at the Sheffield Crucible
Posh, 2010, premiered at the Royal Court Theatre
The Watsons, 2018, premiered at the Chichester Festival Theatre
Home, I'm Darling, 2018, premiered at Theatr Clywd

Unpublished
Limbo, Sheffield Crucible Studio, 1996
Fear of Flying, Bristol University, 1997
White Feathers, Bristol University, 1999
16 Winters, Bristol Old Vic Basement, 2000
The Wild Swans, Playbox Theatre, Warwick, 2000
TwelveMachine, Playbox Theatre, Warwick, 2001
The Last Child, Playbox Theatre, Warwick, 2002
Young Emma, Finborough Theatre, 2003

Awards
Critics' Circle Theatre Award for Most Promising Playwright for Breathing Corpses and Colder Than Here, 2005
Pearson Playwrights Award Bursary in association with the Finborough Theatre, 2004
Pearson Playwrights Best Play Award for Breathing Corpses, 2005
Joint winner of the George Devine Award for Breathing Corpses, 2006
Olivier Award Nomination for Outstanding Achievement in an Affiliate Theatre for Breathing Corpses and Colder Than Here, 2006
Olivier Award Winner for Best Comedy for Home, I'm Darling, 2019

References

External links
Laura Wade at the Rod Hall Agency
Oberon Books
Dramatists Play Service

Living people
Alumni of the University of Bristol
English women dramatists and playwrights
People from Bedford
20th-century English dramatists and playwrights
21st-century British dramatists and playwrights
20th-century English women writers
21st-century English women writers
1977 births